Eugnathogobius is a genus of gobies native to fresh, brackish and marine waters of the Indian Ocean and the western Pacific Ocean region.

Species
, there are nine recognized species in this genus:
 Eugnathogobius illotus 
 Eugnathogobius indicus Larson, 2009
 Eugnathogobius kabilia (Herre, 1940)
 Eugnathogobius mas (Hora, 1923)
 Eugnathogobius microps H. M. Smith, 1931
 Eugnathogobius mindora (Herre, 1945) (Stripe-face Calamiana)
 Eugnathogobius siamensis (Fowler, 1934)
 Eugnathogobius stictos Larson, 2009
 Eugnathogobius variegatus (W. K. H. Peters, 1868)

References

Gobionellinae
Taxa named by Hugh McCormick Smith